USS Gray (FF-1054) was a United States Navy . She was named for Marine Corps Sergeant Ross F. Gray, who was a posthumous recipient of the Medal of Honor.

Design and description
The Knox class design was derived from the  modified to extend range and without a long-range missile system. They displaced  at full load. Their crew consisted of 13 officers and 211 enlisted men.

The ships were equipped with one Westinghouse geared steam turbine that drove the single propeller shaft.

The Knox-class ships were armed with a 5"/54 caliber Mark 42 gun forward and a single 3-inch/50-caliber gun aft. They mounted an eight-round ASROC launcher between the 5-inch (127 mm) gun and the bridge. Close-range anti-submarine defense was provided by two twin  Mk 32 torpedo tubes. The ships were equipped with a torpedo-carrying DASH drone helicopter; its telescoping hangar and landing pad were positioned amidships aft of the mack. Beginning in the 1970s, the DASH was replaced by a SH-2 Seasprite LAMPS I helicopter and the hangar and landing deck were accordingly enlarged. Most ships also had the 3-inch (76 mm) gun replaced by an eight-cell BPDMS missile launcher in the early 1970s.

Gray carried the AN/SLQ-32 Electronic Warfare Suite. For anti-submarine work, she carried AN/SQS-26 Sonar and the AN/SQR-18 Towed array sonars. The ship also carried the AN/SPS-40 Air Search Radar and the AN/SPS-67 Surface Search Radar.

Construction and career 
Gray was constructed by Todd Pacific Shipyards, Seattle, Washington, laid down 19 November 1966, launched 3 November 1967 and delivered 27 March 1970. Gray was commissioned 4 April 1970, reclassified from a destroyer escort as a Frigate 30 June 1975. Gray was the third of the 46 Knox-class frigates built.

Gray served in the Surface Force of the United States Pacific Fleet. She made numerous deployments to the Western Pacific and Indian Oceans, including in support of United States Naval operations during the Vietnam War. In the early 1980s her home port was San Diego, California. In 1982 she was reassigned to the reserve fleet in Long Beach, California. In later years her home port was Naval Station Treasure Island, in San Francisco. She was decommissioned 29 June 1991, struck 11 January 1995 and scrapped 21 July 2001.

Awards 
 Battle "E" Ribbon
 Navy Expeditionary Medal
 National Defense Service Medal
 Armed Forces Expeditionary Medal
 Vietnam Service Medal
 Sea Service Deployment Ribbon (Multiple)
 Republic of Vietnam Campaign Medal
 Humanitarian Service Medal (Awarded for Loma Prieta Earthquake Servies, 1989

Notes

References 

navsource.org

External links 

DANFS Gray
Navysite.de

 

Ships built in Seattle
Knox-class frigates
Cold War frigates and destroyer escorts of the United States
1967 ships